is a city located in Ibaraki Prefecture, Japan. , the city had an estimated population of 45,997 in 18,455 households and a population density of 221.6 persons per km². The percentage of the population aged over 65 was 34.1%.

Geography
Hokota is located in central Ibaraki Prefecture, approximately 90 kilometers northeast of Tokyo and within 30 kilometers of Mito City, the prefectural capital. The eastern side of the city faces the Pacific Ocean and has a long shallow coastline from north to south. Most of the inland area is flat, and agriculture that takes advantage of the flat terrain and the mild climate is the core industry..

Surrounding municipalities
Ibaraki Prefecture
 Kashima
 Namegata
 Omitama
 Ōarai

Climate
Hokota has a Humid continental climate (Köppen Cfa) characterized by warm summers and cold winters with light snowfall.

Demographics
Per Japanese census data, the population of Hokota has remained relatively steady over the past 70 years.

History
The town of Hokota was created with the establishment of the modern municipalities system on April 1, 1889. The city of Hokota was established on October 11, 2005, from the merger of the former town of Hokota, and the villages of Asahi and Taiyō (all from Kashima District).

Government
Hokota has a mayor-council form of government with a directly elected mayor and a unicameral city council of 18 members. Hokota, together with neighboring Ōarai and Ibaraki, contributes two members to the Ibaraki Prefectural Assembly. In terms of national politics, the city is part of Ibaraki 2nd district of the lower house of the Diet of Japan.

Economy
The economy of Hokota is primarily agricultural, with melons as a major cash crop.

Education
 Hokota has ten public elementary schools and five public middle schools operated by the city government, and two public high schools operated by the Ibaraki Prefectural Board of Education.

Transportation

Railway
 -  Kashima Rinkai Railway – Ōarai Kashima Line
 -  -  -  -  -

Highway

Local attractions
Otake Beach
Kashima Littoral Park

Notable people from Hokota 
 Tetsuya Asano, soccer player

References

External links
Official website 

Cities in Ibaraki Prefecture
Populated coastal places in Japan
Hokota, Ibaraki